Nikos Rizos (30 September 1924, in Peta – 20 April 1999, in Athens) was a Greek actor. He took part in many Greek comedies in cinema. He and his wife Elsa had one son.

Career

Rizos began his career with Anthropoi, anthropoi in 1948 at the Metropolitan Theatre. He founded his own company in 1959 which he co-ran from 1961 with Vasilis Avlonitis and Georgia Vasileiadou. He appeared in various comedies in Greece and Germany, performing for the immigrant Greeks abroad. In 1986, he appeared at the Astor Theatre on Stadiou Street which he ran from the artistic performance until 1990. Rizos changed and he was a  theatrical entrepreneur for 27 years.

He starred in around 300 comedy films including To soferaki (with Giorgos Tzavellas), O thisavros tou makariti (with Nikos Tsiforos), O Klearchos, i Marina kai o kontos, Simoria eraston, and others. On television, he starred alongside Martha Karagianni in O dromos (The Road). In 1999, he appeared in the television series of Tassos Athanassiadis's I aithousa tou thronou. It was his last appearance on television.

Death
Rizos' last years were spent in Gkyzi. He suffered a heart attack on 20 April 1999 and died in an Athens hospital from edema. He was 74 years old. He is buried at Athens First Cemetery.

Filmography

As himself:

References

External links

1924 births
1999 deaths
Greek male actors
Greek male film actors
Greek comedians
20th-century Greek male actors
20th-century comedians
People from Arta (regional unit)